Christian Larrivée (born August 25, 1982) is a Canadian professional ice hockey player. He played in the North American minor leagues until 2006, when he moved to Europe.

Born in Gaspé, Quebec, Quebec, Canada, Larrivée played junior hockey for the Chicoutimi Sagueneens from 1999–2003. He was drafted by the Montreal Canadiens of the NHL in the fourth round (114th overall) in 2000. In 2003, he was signed by Canadiens and played for the Canadiens' top affiliate the Hamilton Bulldogs of the AHL and the Columbus Cottonmouths of the ECHL. He played the following season with the Long Beach Ice Dogs of the ECHL and nine games with Hamilton. In 2005–06, he played the entire season with Long Beach.

In 2006, he moved to Europe and played for Storhamar Dragons in the GET-ligaen in Norway during the 2006-07 season. There, he was named Most Valuable Player in the playoffs. He scored a record 32 points in 17 playoff games. The two following seasons he spent with Rødovre Mighty Bulls in Denmark.

In 2009–10 he played for the HockeyAllsvenskan team Västerås IK or V.I.K. He signed a two-year contract with the Storhamar Dragons in July 2010. After finishing the contract he signed a four-year extension to stay with Storhamar.

He was named the most valuable player again in the 2014-15 playoffs, when Storhamar lost 4-3 in matches to Stavanger Oilers. On April 11, 2019, Larrivée became the player with the most play-off goals in Storhamar history, netting his 49th in a 5-1 win against Frisk Asker in the 4th game of the 2018/19 finals.

He is a cult player for Storhamar, earning the nickname "Talismanen", the Talisman.

Career statistics

References

External links
 

1982 births
Canadian expatriate ice hockey players in Denmark
Canadian expatriate ice hockey players in Norway
Canadian expatriate sportspeople in Sweden
Canadian expatriate sportspeople in the United States
Canadian ice hockey centres
Hamilton Bulldogs (AHL) players
Living people
Montreal Canadiens draft picks
People from Gaspé, Quebec
Rødovre Mighty Bulls players
Storhamar Dragons players